Ghiyath Shah, also known as Ghiyas-ud-Din Shah or Ghiyasuddin, was a Sultan of the Malwa Sultanate in the fifteenth century. The son of his predecessor Mahmud Shah I, he reigned from 1469 to 1500. A military leader before his accession, he was known during his reign for his religious devotion and cultural life. During his reign, the Nimatnama-i-Nasiruddin-Shahi was written and illustrated. His court was known for having over 12,000 women, including entertainers and scholars. His exiled son Nasir-ud-Din Shah revolted and took the throne in October 1500. Ghiyasuddin was found dead four months later and is believed to have been poisoned by his son and successor.

Biography
The eldest son of Mahmud, Ghiyath served his father as a military leader. He was made Shah at the death of his father in 1469. According to Firishta, shortly after his accession, he held a grand feast at which he announced that after thirty-four years on the field he was yielding his military rule to his son. He was also known as Ghiyas-ud-Din Shah and Ghiyasuddin.

Ghiyasuddin then retired to a life away from the battlefield, constructing the palace of Jahaz Mahal, and created a court that was a place of culture. He was also known as an eccentric lover of art. For example, Nimatnama-i-Nasiruddin-Shahi (Book of Delights) is a cookery book produced between 1495 and 1505 for the sultan that is richly illustrated in a fusion of Persian and pre-Islamic Indian styles.  The book contains fifty images, including the sultan, servants, landscapes and buildings as well as food preparation.

He was devoutly religious. He abstained from intoxicating drink and foods forbidden on religious grounds. According to Firishta, he gave instructions to his attendants that he should always be woken at the hour of prayer and that they were known to pull him out of bed while he was asleep.

Towards the end of his life, there was conflict between his eldest son Nasir-ud-Din Shah, who had commanded the army, and his youngest son Ala-ud-Din.  Nasir-ud-Din was chased from the capital Mando in 1499, but ultimately triumphed, returning to the palace on 22 October 1500. Nasir-ud-Din then executed his brother, along with his children and the rest of his family, and was formally crowned. Ghiyasuddin was found dead four months later, widely believed to have been poisoned by his son and successor.

Attitude to Women
There were 12,000 women in Ghiyasuddin's court, including musicians, dancers and wrestlers.  Ghiyath was interested in female education and set up a Madrasa in Sarangpur to teach the women of his court. Tutors were engaged to teach the royal princesses and over seventy women were well versed in the Quran.
According to historian Ramya Sreenivasan, the king had a roving eye, and is reported to have undertaken the quest for Padmini, not a particular Rajput princess, but the ideal type of woman according to Hindu erotology.

References

See also
List of rulers of Malwa

Year of birth missing
1500 deaths
Kings of Malwa
15th-century Indian Muslims
15th-century monarchs in Asia